Brad Mears (born December 24, 1970) is a University of Central Missouri professor and a retired American shot putter, who won the gold medal at the 1999 Pan American Games. He has earned a Doctorate in Pedagogy from the University of Northern Colorado in 2000, his master's from the University of Central Missouri in 1997 and his bachelor's degree from Central Missouri State University in 1994. He is a 1989 graduate of Neosho High School, Neosho Missouri.

As a Track and Field Athlete, Brad holds 9 Missouri All State titles for Neosho High School, and 7 All America Titles and a National Championship for the University of Central Missouri. He competed professionally in 1995–2000. Other athletic personal best are: Track and Field: Discus , Javelin . Olympic Weight Lifting Personal Bests (+109 group): Total . Individual Lifts: Clean and Jerk , Snatch .

From 1994 to 1998, Brad was a public school teacher in the Warrensburg R-6 School District, Warrensburg, Missouri. During that time, he taught Early Childhood, Elementary, Middle School and High School Physical Education, Early Childhood, Middle School and High School Adapted Physical Education.

From 1994 to 1998, Brad was also a University of Central Missouri Track and Field Assistant Throws Coach, where he coached 7 All America titles and 1 National Champion.

As a professor of Pedagogy in Physical Education, at the University of Central Missouri, Brad's scholarly work has focused on human physical/structural development and function, related to the areas of Developmental Neurology, Brain Based Learning, Autism and Attention Deficit Disorder, Behavior Analysis and Child Development with over 200 publications and/or presentations worldwide.

Brad is also the President and CO-Founder of the Mears Foundation for Autism, a not for profit foundation that serves individuals, families, and communities impacted by autism.

Achievements

References

 

1970 births
Living people
American male shot putters
Athletes (track and field) at the 1999 Pan American Games
Pan American Games gold medalists for the United States
Pan American Games medalists in athletics (track and field)
Medalists at the 1999 Pan American Games